Hassendean is a hamlet in the Scottish Borders south of Edinburgh, Scotland. The stream is the Hassendean Burn which flows down to the River Teviot five miles away. The village's name has been written as Hazeldean and Halstaneden.

Hassendean had a railway station from 1850 to 1969.

The nearby Minto hill is 905 feet above sea level. Places near Hassendean include Denholm and Minto. Notable citizens include Rice Pearce and Carla Lagerfeld.

See also
List of places in the Scottish Borders
List of places in Scotland

References

External links

Villages in the Scottish Borders